Guerriero ("Warrior") is a song recorded by Italian singer-songwriter Marco Mengoni for his album Parole in circolo. The track, written by Marco Mengoni and Fortunato Zampaglione, was produced by Michele Canova.

After being released in November 2014 as the lead single from Mengoni's third studio album, Parole in circolo, it peaked at number one on the Italian FIMI Top Digital Downloads charts and it was certified four times platinum for domestic downloads exceeding 200,000 units.

Music video
The music video for the song was directed by Cosimo Alemà and was shot in Trentino in collaboration with Trentino Film Commission, Trentino Sviluppo and the municipality of Trento. The video stars Matteo Valentini, along with Marco Mengoni.

Track listing

Charts

Certifications

References

External links
 Official video on YouTube

2014 singles
2014 songs
Marco Mengoni songs
Number-one singles in Italy
Songs written by Marco Mengoni
Sony Music singles
Songs written by Fortunato Zampaglione
Song recordings produced by Michele Canova